Anouar Ben Abdallah (born 20 June 1996) is a Tunisian handball player who plays for Kazma SC and the Tunisian national team.

He participated at the 2017 World Men's Handball Championship.

References

1996 births
Living people
Tunisian male handball players
Handball players at the 2014 Summer Youth Olympics